= Nour Haidar =

Yemeni educator

Nour Haidar was a twentieth-century pioneer of girl's education in Yemen.

Helped by her sister, Lola Haidar, Nour Haidar established a mi'lama (place of Islamic learning) for girls at her home: the school taught Qur'an and basic Arab literacy. In 1934 the mi'lama was converted by the British into a primary school, with Nour remaining as principal.
